This is a list of the main career statistics and records of retired Swedish professional tennis player Björn Borg. His professional career spanned from 1973 until 1984 with a brief comeback between 1991 and 1993.

Grand Slam finals

Singles: 16 (11 titles, 5 runner-ups)

Grand Prix year-end championships finals

Singles: 4 (2 titles, 2 runner-ups)

WCT year-end championship finals

Singles: 4 (1 title, 3 runner-ups)

Grand Prix Super Series finals

Singles: 20 (15 titles, 5 runner-ups)

Note: before the ATP took over running the men's professional tour in 1990 the Grand Prix Tour had a series of events that were precursors to the Masters Series known during some years as the Grand Prix Super Series.

Singles performance timeline

Career finals

Singles titles (66)

Runner-ups (27)

Singles titles – invitational tournaments exhibitions, or special events (35)

Non-ATP, exhibition, invitational, or special events – draw ≥ 8 (9)

Non-ATP, exhibition, invitational, or special events – draw < 8 (26)

Records and statistics

Youngest to win
In 1972 Borg became the youngest winner of a Davis Cup match at age 15.
Borg won his 11th Grand Slam singles title in 1981 aged 25 years and one day, the youngest male to reach that number of titles. By comparison, Roger Federer won his 11th aged 25 years and 324 days; Rafael Nadal was aged 26 years and 8 days; Pete Sampras won his 11th at almost age 27, Novak Djokovic at age 28, Roy Emerson at age 30, and Rod Laver at age 31.

Statistics
Borg's 66 official ATP career titles as listed on the Association of Tennis Professionals (ATP) website places him eighth on the Open Era list behind Jimmy Connors (109), Roger Federer (103), Ivan Lendl (94), Rafael Nadal (86), Novak Djokovic (81), John McEnroe (77), Rod Laver (72).
In 1979, Borg became the first tennis player to earn more than one million dollars in prize money in a single season.
On the list of open era winning streaks, Borg is first and second (49 consecutive tour matches in 1978, 48 in 1979–1980). The only other men with winning streaks of at least 40 matches are Guillermo Vilas (46), Ivan Lendl (44), Novak Djokovic (43), John McEnroe (42), and Roger Federer (41).
Borg holds third place for most consecutive wins on clay, with 46 victories in 1977–79. Only Rafael Nadal with 81 and Vilas with 53 have won more consecutive clay court matches.
Borg won 19 consecutive points on serve in the fifth set on two occasions: his 1980 Wimbledon final against McEnroe and his 1980 US Open quarterfinal against Roscoe Tanner.
Borg retired in 1983 with $3.6 million in career prize money, a record at the time.
According to the match scores listed on the ATP website, Borg bageled his opponents (sets won 6–0) 131 times in his career, compared to Federer's 93 bagels from 1999 through 2019 Basel.
Borg was inducted into the International Tennis Hall of Fame in 1987 at 30 years of age.
In 1999, Borg was elected the best Swedish sportsman ever by a jury in his home country. His tennis rivals included a pair of top ranked players: Mats Wilander (who won seven Grand Slam titles) and Stefan Edberg (who won six).
In their only career match-up, Borg defeated Wilander in September 1981 in the first round of a tournament in Geneva, Switzerland. The score was 6–1, 6–1. Geneva was the last tournament that Borg won during his career.
Borg won the Svenska Dagbladet Gold Medal in 1974 and 1978, the latter being shared with  alpine skier Ingemar Stenmark. They are the only men to have won this honor twice.

Top 10 head-to-head record
Borg's record against players ranked in the ATP's top 10. World No. 1's are in bold.

Junior career finals

Grand Slam finals

Singles: 1 (1–0)

Notes

References

Statistics
Borg, Bjorn